Gustavo Díaz Ordaz is a municipality located in the Mexican state of Tamaulipas.

Towns and villages

The largest localities (cities, towns, and villages) are:

Adjacent municipalities and counties

 Reynosa Municipality - east and south
 General Bravo Municipality, Nuevo León - south
 Camargo Municipality - west and northwest
 Starr County, Texas - north
 Hidalgo County, Texas - northeast

External links
Gobierno Municipal de Gustavo Díaz Ordaz Official website

References

Municipalities of Tamaulipas
Tamaulipas populated places on the Rio Grande